Atarib District is a district of Aleppo Governorate in northern Syria. Administrative centre is the city of Atarib.

The district is located in the central western region of the Aleppo Governorate, sharing its west border with the Idlib Governorate. Until December 2008, it was a subdistrict of the neighboring Mount Simeon District. At the 2004 census, the subdistrict had a population of 76,873.

Subdistricts
The district of Atarib is divided into three subdistricts or nawāḥī:

References

 
Districts of Aleppo Governorate
2009 establishments in Syria